The Kafia Kingi area is a mineral-rich region on the border between Sudan, South Sudan and the Central African Republic. It is disputed between South Sudan and Sudan. 

The area was due to be given to South Sudan under the terms of the 2005 Comprehensive Peace Agreement which required use of the Sudan "north–south line" as of 1 January 1956. It was not until 1960 that the Kafia Kingi area was transferred north of that line and added to Darfur. Sudan controls all or most of this area today, though at times since independence South Sudan forces have briefly controlled large portions.

Almost all of Kafia Kingi (except a southern portion south of the Umblasha River) is within the borders of the Sudanese Radom National Park, a biosphere reserve, of which two-thirds are also within the borders of Kafia Kingi, while another one-third of the National Park is within the Sudanese region of South Darfur.

The Kafia Kingi region is a known haven for ivory smugglers. Congolese ivory is frequently held in Kafia Kingi before being taken north into Darfur.

References

Populated places in South Darfur
Populated places in Western Bahr el Ghazal
Territorial disputes of South Sudan
Territorial disputes of Sudan